John Readhead & Sons was a shipyard on the River Tyne in South Shields, Tyne and Wear, England founded in 1865.

History
John Readhead and John Softley founded the business in 1865 in South Shields as Readhead and Softley. The first ship they built was a small collier called Unus. Swan Hunter bought the company in 1967 after publication of the Geddes Report which recommended rationalisation of shipbuilding on the River Tyne. It was nationalised with the rest of Swan Hunter in 1977. The yard at South Shields closed in 1984.

References

Further reading

External links

Defunct companies based in Tyne and Wear
Manufacturing companies established in 1865
Manufacturing companies disestablished in 1984
1865 establishments in England
1984 disestablishments in England
South Shields
British companies disestablished in 1984
British companies established in 1865
British Shipbuilders